Skagit Valley Provincial Park is a provincial park in British Columbia, Canada, centred on the Skagit River and its tributaries. The park is 27,964 Hectares. The park borders E. C. Manning Provincial Park in Canada and Ross Lake National Recreation Area and North Cascades National Park in the United States.  It includes part of Ross Lake, a reservoir formed by a hydroelectric dam in Whatcom County, Washington.

See also
Chilliwack Lake Provincial Park

References

External links

Lower Mainland
Provincial parks of British Columbia
Protected areas established in 1973
1973 establishments in British Columbia